Transition metal pyridine complexes encompass many coordination complexes that contain pyridine as a ligand.  Most examples are mixed-ligand complexes.  Many variants of pyridine are also known to coordinate to metal ions, such as the methylpyridines, quinolines, and more complex rings.

Bonding
With a pKa of 5.25 for its conjugate acid, pyridine is about 15x less basic than imidazole. Pyridine is a weak pi-acceptor ligand.  Trends in the M-N distances for complexes of the type [MCl2(py)4]2+ reveal an anticorrelation with d-electron count. Few low-valent metal complexes of pyridines are known.  The role of pyridine as a Lewis base extends also to main group chemistry. Examples include sulfur trioxide pyridine complex SO3(py) and pyridine adduct of borane, BH3py.

Classification of metal-pyridine complexes
Many metal pyridine complexes are known. These complexes can be classified according to their geometry, i.e. octahedral, tetrahedral, linear, etc.

Octahedral complexes

Owing to the relatively wide C-N-C angle, the 2,6-hydrogen atoms interfere with the formation of [M(py)6]z complexes.  A few octahedral homoleptic pyridine complexes are known. These complex cations are found in the salts [Ru(py)6]Fe4(CO)13 and [Ru(py)6](BF4)2. Some compounds with the stoichiometry M(py)6(ClO4)2 have been reformulated as [M(py)4(ClO4)2].(py)2 

A common family of pyridine complexes are of the type [MCl2(py)4]n+.  The chloride ligands are mutually trans in these complexes. 

The tris(pyridine) trihalides, i.e., [MCl3(py)3] (M = Ti, Cr, Rh Ir), are another large class of M-Cl-py complexes.

Four-coordinate complexes

Four-coordinate complexes include tetrahedral and square planar derivatives.  Examples of homoleptic tetrahedral complexes include [M(py)4]n+ for Mn+ = Cu+, M = Ni2+, Ag+, and Ag2+. Examples of homoleptic square planar complexes include the d8 cations [M(py)4]n+ for Mn+ = Pd2+, Pt2+, Au3+.

Ni(ClO4)2(3-picoline)2 can be isolated in two isomers, yellow, diamagnetic square planar or blue, paramagnetic tetrahedral.

Mn(II) and Co(II) form both tetrahedral MCl2py2 and octahedral MCl2py4 complexes, depending on conditions:
MCl2py2  +  2 py →  MCl2py4

Two- and three-coordinate complexes
Many examples exist for [Au(py)2]+. [Ag(py)3]+ and [Cu(py)2]+ are also precedented.

Pi-complexes
The η6 coordination mode, as occurs in η6 benzene complexes, is observed only in sterically encumbered derivatives that block the nitrogen center.

Comparison with related ligands
Picolines
Many substituted pyridines function as ligands for transition metals.  The monomethyl derivatives, the picolines (2-, 3-, and 4-picoline), are best studied. 2-Picolines are sterically impeded from coordination.

2,2'-bipy
Coupling of two pyridine rings at  their 2-positions gives 2,2'-bipyridine, a widely studied bidentate ligand.  A number of differences are apparent between pyridine and bipyridine complexes.  Many [M(bipy)3]z complexes are known, whereas analogous [M(py)6]z  complexes are rare and apparently labile.  Bipyridine is a redox-noninnocent ligand, as illustrated by the existence of complexes such as [Cr(bipy)3]0.  The pyridine analogues of such complexes are unknown.  The dichloro complexes [MCl2(bipy)2]n+ tend to be cis, as exemplified by RuCl2(bipy)2.  In contrast, the complexes [MCl2(py)4]n+ are always trans.

Imidazoles
Imidazoles comprise another major series of N-heterocyclic ligands.  Unlike pyridines, imidazole derivatives are common ligands in nature.

Applications and occurrence
Crabtree's catalyst, a popular catalyst for hydrogenations, is a pyridine complex.

Although transition metal pyridine complexes have few practical applications, they are widely used synthetic precursors. Many are anhydrous, soluble in nonpolar solvents, and susceptible to alkylation by organolithium and Grignard reagents. Thus CoCl2(py)4 has proven very useful in organocobalt chemistry and NiCl2(py)4 useful in organonickel chemistry.

References

Transition metal compounds